Adrien Édouard Jean Moreau (31 July 1888 – 5 June 1972) was a French politician.

Moreau was born in Paris.  He belonged first to the Republican Party of Liberty (1945–1946), then to the Independent Republicans (1946–1955) and then to the National Centre of Independents and Peasants (1956–1958).  He figured prominently amongst the organisers of the European Youth Campaign. During 1953, he was France minister of Budget for a few months.  He was mayor of Auxerre from 1941 to 1944 and from 1947 to 1971, and died there.

References

1888 births
1972 deaths
Politicians from Paris
Republican Party of Liberty politicians
National Centre of Independents and Peasants politicians
French Ministers of Budget
Members of the Constituent Assembly of France (1945)
Members of the Constituent Assembly of France (1946)
Deputies of the 1st National Assembly of the French Fourth Republic
Deputies of the 2nd National Assembly of the French Fourth Republic
Deputies of the 3rd National Assembly of the French Fourth Republic